A list of films released in Japan in 1953 (see 1953 in film).

See also
1953 in Japan

References

Footnotes

Sources

External links
Japanese films of 1953 at the Internet Movie Database

1953
Japanese
Films